Samuel Chao Chung Ting (born January 27, 1936) is a Chinese-American physicist who, with Burton Richter, received the Nobel Prize in 1976 for discovering the subatomic J/ψ particle. More recently he has been the principal investigator in research conducted with the Alpha Magnetic Spectrometer, a device installed on the International Space Station in 2011.

Biography 
Ting was born to Chinese parents both from Ju County, Shandong province on January 27, 1936, in Ann Arbor, Michigan. His parents, Kuan-hai Ting and Tsun-ying Wong, met and married as graduate students at the University of Michigan.

Ting's parents returned to China two months after his birth where Ting was homeschooled by his parents throughout WWII. After the communist takeover of the mainland that forced the nationalist government to flee to Taiwan, Ting moved to the island in 1949. He would live in Taiwan from 1949 to 1956 and conducted most of his formal schooling there. His father started to teach engineering and his mother would teach psychology at National Taiwan University (NTU). Ting attended and finished Middle School in Taiwan.

In 1956, Ting, who barely spoke English, returned to the United States at the age of 20 and attended the University of Michigan. There, he studied engineering, mathematics, and physics. He received Bachelor of Science in Engineering degrees in mathematics and in physics in 1959 and a Doctor of Philosophy degree in physics in 1962.

In 1963, Ting worked at the European Organization for Nuclear Research (CERN). From 1965, he taught at Columbia University in the City of New York and worked at the Deutsches Elektronen-Synchrotron (DESY) in Germany. Since 1969, Ting has been a professor at the Massachusetts Institute of Technology (MIT).

Ting recived the Ernest Orlando Lawrence Award in 1976, Nobel Prize in Physics in 1976, Eringen Medal in 1977, DeGaspari Award in Science from the Government of Italy in 1988, Gold Medal for Science from Brescia, Italy in 1988, and the NASA Public Service Medal in 2001.

Nobel Prize 

In 1976, Ting was awarded the Nobel Prize in Physics, which he shared with Burton Richter of the Stanford Linear Accelerator Center, for the discovery of the J/ψ meson nuclear particle. They were chosen for the award, in the words of the Nobel committee, "for their pioneering work in the discovery of a heavy elementary particle of a new kind." The discovery was made in 1974 when Ting was heading a research team at MIT exploring new regimes of high energy particle physics.

Ting gave his Nobel Prize acceptance speech in Mandarin. Although there had been Chinese Nobel Prize recipients before (Tsung-Dao Lee and Chen Ning Yang), none had previously delivered the acceptance speech in Chinese. In his Nobel banquet speech, Ting emphasized the importance of experimental work:

 In reality, a theory in natural science cannot be without experimental foundations; physics, in particular, comes from experimental work. I hope that awarding the Nobel Prize to me will awaken the interest of students from the developing nations so that they will realize the importance of experimental work.

Alpha Magnetic Spectrometer 

In 1995, not long after the cancellation of the Superconducting Super Collider project had severely reduced the possibilities for experimental high-energy physics on Earth, Ting proposed the Alpha Magnetic Spectrometer, a space-borne cosmic-ray detector. The proposal was accepted and he became the principal investigator and has been directing the development since then. A prototype, AMS-01, was flown and tested on Space Shuttle mission STS-91 in 1998. The main mission, AMS-02, was then planned for launch by the Shuttle and mounting on the International Space Station.

This project is a massive $2 billion undertaking involving 500 scientists from 56 institutions and 16 countries. After the 2003 Space Shuttle Columbia disaster, NASA announced that the Shuttle was to be retired by 2010 and that AMS-02 was not on the manifest of any of the remaining Shuttle flights. Dr. Ting was forced to (successfully) lobby the United States Congress and the public to secure an additional Shuttle flight dedicated to this project. Also during this time, Ting had to deal with numerous technical problems in fabricating and qualifying the large, extremely sensitive and delicate detector module for space. AMS-02 was successfully launched on Shuttle mission STS-134 on May 16, 2011 and was installed on the International Space Station on May 19, 2011.

Research 
 Discovery of nuclear anti-matter (the anti-deuteron). 
 Measuring the size of the electron family (the electron, the muon, and the tau) showing that the electron family has zero size (with a radius smaller than 10−17 cm).
 Precision study of light rays and massive light rays showing that light rays and massive light rays (vector mesons) can transform into each other at high energies and providing a critical verification of the quark model.
 Precision measurement of the radius of the atomic nuclei.
 Discovery of a new kind of matter (the J particle) at the Brookhaven National Laboratory. The Nobel Prize was awarded to Ting for this discovery.
 Discovery of the gluon (the particle responsible for transmitting the nuclear force).
 A systematic study of the properties of gluons.
 A precision measurement of muon charge asymmetry, demonstrating for the first time the validity of the Standard Electroweak Model (Steven Weinberg, Sheldon Glashow and Abdus Salam).
 Determination of the number of electron families and neutrino species in the Universe and the precision verification of the Electroweak Unification Theory.
 Proposed, constructed and leads the Alpha Magnetic Spectrometer (AMS) experiment on the International Space Station involving the participation of a 16 nation collaboration searching for the existence of antimatter, the origin of dark matter and the properties of cosmic rays.
 Development of the first large superconducting magnet for space application.   
 AMS results, based on nine years in space and more than 160 billion cosmic rays, have changed our understanding of the cosmos.

Honors and awards

Major Awards 
 Nobel Prize for Physics (1976)
 Ernest Orlando Lawrence Award (U.S. government)
 Eringen Medal (the Society of Engineering Science)
 DeGaspari Award in Science (Italian government)
 NASA Public Service Medal
 Erice Prize for Peace (World Federation of Scientists)
 Gold Medal for Science (Italy)
 Award for Compelling Results in Physical Sciences (2017, NASA)
 Golden Plate Award of the American Academy of Achievement
 Golden Leopard Award for Excellence, Taormina, Italy

Member or Foreign Member of Scientific Academies 
 United States National Academy of Sciences
 American Academy of Arts and Sciences
 Soviet Academy of Science
 Russian Academy of Sciences
 Deutsche Akademie der Naturforscher Leopoldina (Germany)
 Spanish Royal Academy of Sciences
 Hungarian Academy of Sciences
 Pakistan Academy of Sciences
 Academia Sinica
 Chinese Academy of Sciences
 Honorary Fellow of the Tata Institute of Fundamental Research

Doctor Honoris Causa degrees 
 University of Bologna
 Moscow State University
 University of Bucharest
 National Tsing Hua University (Taiwan)
 National Chiao Tung University (Taiwan)
 Rheinisch-Westfälische Technische Hochschule Aachen
 University of Michigan
 Columbia University
 Gustavus Adolphus College
 University of Science and Technology of China
 Hong Kong University of Science and Technology
 National Central University
 Hong Kong Baptist University
 Chinese University of Hong Kong

Personal life 
Ting lived in a turbulent age during his childhood and his family was a big influence on him. In his biographical for the Nobel Prize, he recalled:

 Since both my parents were working, I was brought up by my maternal grandmother. My maternal grandfather lost his life during the first Chinese Revolution. After that, at the age of thirty-three, my grandmother decided to go to school, became a teacher, and brought my mother up alone. When I was young I often heard stories from my mother and grandmother recalling the difficult lives they had during that turbulent period and the efforts they made to provide my mother with a good education. Both of them were daring, original, and determined people, and they have left an indelible impression on me.

 When I was twenty years old I decided to return to the United States for a better education. My parents' friend, G.G. Brown, Dean of the School of Engineering, University of Michigan, told my parents I would be welcome to stay with him and his family. At that time I knew very little English and had no idea of the cost of living in the United States. In China, I had read that many American students go through college on their own resources. I informed my parents that I would do likewise. I arrived at the Detroit airport on 6 September 1956 with $100, which at the time seemed more than adequate. I was somewhat frightened, did not know anyone, and communication was difficult.

Ting is the eldest son of his family. He has one brother, Ting Chao-hua and one sister, Ting Chao-min. In an interview with China Central Television, he explained that the combination of his siblings' and his name is the first three characters of "" (Republic of China). His parents named them after the country to commemorate their grandfather Wang Yicheng, who was a martyr in the Xinhai Revolution. 

In 1960, Ting married Kay Louise Kuhne, an architect, and together they had two daughters, Jeanne Ting Chowning and Amy Ting. In 1985 he married Dr. Susan Carol Marks, and they had one son, Christopher, born in 1986.

Selected publications

See also 

 MIT Physics Department
 List of multiple discoveries
 J/ψ meson
 Alpha Magnetic Spectrometer

References

External links 

  including the Nobel Lecture, December 11, 1976 The Discovery of the J Particle: A Personal Recollection
 Biography and Bibliographic Resources, from the Office of Scientific and Technical Information, United States Department of Energy
 Faculty page at MIT
 Nobel-Winners.com Bio
 PBS bio
 Scientific publications of Samuel C. C. Ting on INSPIRE-HEP

1936 births
Living people
20th-century American physicists
21st-century American physicists
American expatriates in Taiwan
American Nobel laureates
American people of Chinese descent
Brookhaven National Laboratory Nobel laureates
Chinese Civil War refugees
Columbia University faculty
Foreign Fellows of Pakistan Academy of Sciences
Fellows of the American Association for the Advancement of Science
Foreign members of the Chinese Academy of Sciences
Foreign Members of the Russian Academy of Sciences
Foreign Members of the USSR Academy of Sciences
Massachusetts Institute of Technology School of Science faculty
Members of Academia Sinica
Members of the United States National Academy of Sciences
Nobel laureates in Physics
Particle physicists
People associated with CERN
People from Ann Arbor, Michigan
Scientists from Michigan
University of Michigan alumni